Miniota, Manitoba is an unincorporated community recognized as a local urban district in Prairie View Municipality, Manitoba, Canada.  It is located northwest of Virden near the intersection of PTH 83 and PTH 24. The post office opened in 1885 on 36-13-27W. It was originally named Parkisimo and changed to its present name in 1900. It had two railways in its history: the Canadian Pacific Railway and the Grand Trunk Railway (now Canadian National Railway). Both had rail points about one mile apart and there was a Miniota Station on the latter. 

Miniota has a K-8 school, a motel, and the biggest employer is the local co-op. There is also the Miniota Municipal Museum. The Rural Municipality of Miniota has its offices in the community.

Demographics 

References 

 Geographic Names of Manitoba (p. 176) - the Millennium Bureau of Canada

Local urban districts in Manitoba
Unincorporated communities in Westman Region